Pseudoyersinia is a European genus of praying mantids in the family Mantidae.  Species have been recorded from southern Europe and Atlantic islands.

Species
Pseudoyersinia andreae Galvagni, 1976
Pseudoyersinia betancuriae Wiemers, 1993
 †Pseudoyersinia brevipennis Yersin, 1860 - type species
Pseudoyersinia canariensis Chopard, 1942
Pseudoyersinia inaspectata Lombardo, 1986
Pseudoyersinia kabilica Lombardo, 1986
Pseudoyersinia lagrecai  Lombardo, 1984
Pseudoyersinia occidentalis  Bolivar, 1914
Pseudoyersinia paui  Bolivar, 1898
Pseudoyersinia pilipes  Chopard, 1954
Pseudoyersinia salvinae  Lombardo, 1986
Pseudoyersinia subaptera  Chopard, 1942 (Synonym: P. lindbergi Chopard, 1954)
Pseudoyersinia teydeana Chopard, 1942

See also
List of mantis genera and species

References

Amelidae
Mantodea genera